Danielle Meskell (born 13 November 1973) is a former rugby union player. She was a member of the squad to the 2010 Women's Rugby World Cup that finished in third place.

She was name to 's 2014 Women's Rugby World Cup squad.

References

External links
Wallaroos Profile

1973 births
Living people
Australia women's international rugby union players
Australian female rugby union players
Female rugby union players
Australian female rugby league players
Australia women's national rugby league team players
20th-century Australian women
21st-century Australian women